Heudicourt is the name or part of the name of the following communes in France:

 Heudicourt, Eure, in the Eure department
 Heudicourt, Somme, in the Somme department
 Heudicourt-sous-les-Côtes, in the Meuse department